Dawin Polanco (born December 12, 1990), better known mononymously as Dawin, is an American singer, songwriter, rapper and record producer from Brooklyn, New York. He is best known for the song "Dessert", which reached number 68 on the Billboard Hot 100.

Career
Dawin released his debut single, "Just Girly Things", in 2014. It reached the top 40 of the Dance/Electronic Songs chart in the United States, and was used in a number of Vines, which led him to sign a record deal in 2014. In 2015, he released the single "Dessert". Released in both a solo version and a version featuring Silentó, it reached the top 10 in Australia and New Zealand, and was certified platinum in the US.

In 2016, he released his second EP, Sunday. In 2017, he released his debut album, Errors.

Discography

Albums
Errors (2017)
Memory Card (2019)

Extended plays
 Dessert (2015)
 Sunday (2016)

Singles

Filmography

Television

References

External links
 Official website
 
 
 

Living people
American male singer-songwriters
Musicians from Brooklyn
Singer-songwriters from New York (state)
1990 births
21st-century American singers
21st-century American male singers